Diego Martel (15 January 1948 – April 2021) was a Spanish swimmer. He competed in the men's 4 × 100 metre freestyle relay at the 1968 Summer Olympics. He died in April 2021 at the age of 73 years.

References

External links
 

1948 births
2021 deaths
Olympic swimmers of Spain
Swimmers at the 1968 Summer Olympics
Sportspeople from Santa Cruz de Tenerife
Spanish male freestyle swimmers